Serge Martinengo de Novack is a French professional football manager.

Career
Since 2002 until 2004 he coached the New Caledonia national football team.

References

External links
Profile at Soccerway.com
Profile at Soccerpunter.com

Year of birth missing (living people)
Living people
French football managers
New Caledonia national football team managers
Place of birth missing (living people)